The 1978 Prince Edward Island general election was held on April 24, 1978.

The election was one of the closest on records, with the governing Liberals of Premier Alexander B. Campbell losing a number of seats to their Progressive Conservative rivals. The razor thin result led to an unstable legislature and another election was held just one year later in 1979.

Party standings

Members elected

The Legislature of Prince Edward Island had two levels of membership from 1893 to 1996 - Assemblymen and Councillors. This was a holdover from when the Island had a bicameral legislature, the General Assembly and the Legislative Council.

In 1893, the Legislative Council was abolished and had its membership merged with the Assembly, though the two titles remained separate and were elected by different electoral franchises. Assembleymen were elected by all eligible voters of within a district. Before 1963, Councillors were only elected by landowners within a district, but afterward they were elected in the same manner as Assemblymen.

Kings

Prince

Queens

Sources

1978 elections in Canada
Elections in Prince Edward Island
1978 in Prince Edward Island
April 1978 events in Canada